The goldcrest is a passerine bird in the kinglet family.

Goldcrest may also refer to:
 USS Goldcrest (AM-78), a minesweeper commissioned in 1940
 USS Goldcrest (AM-80), a steel merchant trawler built in 1928
 USS Goldcrest (AMCU-24), a minesweeper laid down in 1944
 Goldcrest Films, a British film production company
 Goldcrest Point, a point of Bird Island, South Georgia
 Goldcrest, a cultivar of Cupressus macrocarpa

See also
 USS Goldcrest, a list of US warships